Mehmet Yeşil (born 31 May 1998) is a Turkish professional footballer who plays as a centre-back for Süper Lig club İstanbulspor.

Career
Yeşil is a youth product of the academies of Erganispor and Trabzonspor, and was promoted to the latter's senior team in 2016. He made his professional debut with Trabzonspor in a 6–0 Süper Lig loss to Kasımpaşa on 19 May 2016. In the summer of 2016, he transferred to İstanbulspor in the TFF First League. He joined Ofspor on loan in January 2019. He helped İstanbulspor achieve promotion in the 2021-22 season for the first time in 17 years. He started in İstanbulspor's return to the Süper Lig in a in a 2–0 season opening loss to Trabzonspor on 5 August 2022.

International career
Yeşil is a youth international for Turkey, having played for the Turkey U18s and U19s.

Personal life
Yeşil is the cousin of the Turkish footballer Hakan Yeşil.

References

External links
 

1998 births
Living people
Sportspeople from Diyarbakır
Turkish footballers
Turkey youth international footballers
Trabzonspor footballers
İstanbulspor footballers
Ofspor footballers
Süper Lig players
TFF First League players
TFF Third League players
Association football defenders